Associate Professor Leslie Sheffield is an Australian geneticist who led the creation of the Down Syndrome screening program in Melbourne.

He has conducted research on personalised medicine.

References

Australian geneticists
Living people
Year of birth missing (living people)